In logic and mathematics, proof by example (sometimes known as inappropriate generalization) is a logical fallacy whereby the validity of a statement is illustrated through one or more examples or cases—rather than a full-fledged proof.

The structure, argument form and formal form of a proof by example generally proceeds as follows:

Structure:
I know that X is such.
Therefore, anything related to X is also such.

Argument form:
I know that x, which is a member of group X, has the property P.
Therefore, all other elements of X must have the property P.

Formal form:

The following example demonstrates why this line of reasoning is a logical fallacy:
 I've seen a person shoot someone dead.
 Therefore, all people are murderers.

In the common discourse, a proof by example can also be used to describe an attempt to establish a claim using statistically insignificant examples. In which case, the merit of each argument might have to be assessed on an individual basis.

Valid cases of proof by example
In certain circumstances, examples can suffice as logically valid proof.

Proofs of existential statements

In some scenarios, an argument by example may be valid if it leads from a singular premise to an existential conclusion (i.e. proving that a claim is true for at least one case, instead of for all cases). For example:

Socrates is wise.
Therefore, someone is wise.
(or)
I've seen a person steal.
Therefore, (some) people can steal.

These examples outline the informal version of the logical rule known as existential introduction, also known as particularisation or existential generalization:

Existential Introduction
 
 

Likewise, finding a counterexample disproves (proves the negation of) a universal conclusion. This is used in a proof by contradiction.

Exhaustive proofs

Examples also constitute valid, if inelegant, proof, when it has also been demonstrated that the examples treated cover all possible cases.

In mathematics, proof by example can also be used to refer to attempts to illustrate a claim by proving cases of the claim, with the understanding that these cases contain key ideas which can be generalized into a full-fledged proof.

See also
Affirming the consequent
Anecdotal evidence
Bayesian probability
Counterexample
Hand-waving
Inductive reasoning
Problem of induction
Modus ponens
Proof by construction
Proof by intimidation

References

Further reading 

 Benjamin Matschke: Valid proofs by example in mathematics (arXiv)

Quantificational fallacies